Jal is a small city located in Lea County, New Mexico, United States. It is New Mexico's south-easternmost city, and shares a border with eastward state Texas. The population was 2,047 at the 2010 census. Jal is historically important in the natural gas industry, from the early 1900s to the present day.

Geography
Jal is located at  (32.112102, -103.192972).

Demographics

As of the census of 2010, there were 2,047 people, with 788 occupied houses. The population density was 426.5 people per square mile (163.8/km2). There were 1009 housing units at an average density of 210.2 per square mile (80.7/km2). The racial makeup of the city was 84.81% White, 0.83% African American, 0.73% Native American, 11.82% from other races, and 1.66% from two or more races. Hispanic or Latino of any race were 48.12% of the population.

There were 788 households, out of which 34.1% had children under the age of 18 living with them, 56.5% were married couples living together, 11.4% had a female householder with no husband present, and 25.5% were non-families. 23.2% of all households were made up of individuals, and 9.5% had someone living alone who was 65 years of age or older. The average household size was 2.60 and the average family size was 3.04.

In the city, the population was spread out, with 29.5% under the age of 19, 12.2% in their 20s, 10.1% in their 30s, 12.6% in their 40s, 13.2% in their 50s, and 22.4% who were 60 years of age or older. The median age was 38.2 years. For every 100 females, there were 99.5 males. For every 100 females age 18 and over, there were 97.1 males.

The median income for a household in the city was $39,813, and the median income for a family was $51,538. Males had a median income of $46,250 versus $30,147 for females. The per capita income for the city was $20,597. About 12.0% of families and 14.4% of the population were below the poverty line, including 23.6% of those under age 18 and 18.5% of those age 65 or over.

History

During the early 1800s, the Cowden boys of Midland, Texas moved the entire John A. Lynch herd to the Monument draw, about 6 miles northeast of present-day Jal. All the cattle were branded with the JAL brand from shoulder to hip. In the process of trying to rebrand the Cowdens, they found it too big a task so they registered the brand under their name in Silver City, New Mexico Territory.

In 1913, Charles Justis (a merchant) applied for a post office under the name "Jal" to open six miles east of the city of Jal. However, in 1916, Jal became drought-stricken and the store and post office were relocated to Muleshoe Wells and the city of Jal was established in its present location.

On November 1, 1927, Texas Co. brought in the first well, the Rhodes #1. Then on June 2, 1928, a second well, serving up more than 90 million cubic feet of gas a day, was brought online 6 miles west of Jal. This created a “boom town,” with all the prosperity and problems that go with it. The Great Depression and low crude prices caused a sharp slump in drilling and people left in droves. Jal almost became a ghost town overnight.

In the summer of 1934, the Cooper #1 brought the “Big Boom” back to Jal. By then Jal had a passenger train and its population rose to around 500. Housing was in short supply and ranchers opened their homes to “roughnecks”. New businesses sprang up, and with the gas gathering system by El Paso Natural Gas, prosperity continued.

Government
In 1950 a city hall was built. In 1966 it received a renovation, and in 1987 it received another one. By 2019 the municipal authorities considered the 1950 building out of date, so that year they authorized a renovation of the  former Burke Junior High School, with city hall in a  eastern portion. This was under construction in 2021.

Education
It is within Jal Public Schools.

Airport
The city is served by the Lea County/Jal Airport about three miles to the northeast. The airport has a paved, 4700 ft. runway. Jal once saw commuter airline service in 1964 by Solar Airlines.

Climate
Jal experiences a cool semi-arid climate, typical of the high plains of eastern New Mexico. However, it borders a hot semi-arid climate.

Notable people
Charles T. Sinclair, robber and murderer
Kathy Whitworth, winner of 88 LPGA Tour events, more than anyone else; 1965 and 1966 female athlete of the year

References

External links

 

Cities in New Mexico
Cities in Lea County, New Mexico